Casey Corner is an unincorporated community in Nevada County, California. It lies at an elevation of 1417 feet (432 m). Casey Corner is located in Penn Valley. The area is anchored by a shopping center, and several surrounding businesses.

References

Unincorporated communities in California
Unincorporated communities in Nevada County, California